Francisco das Chagas Soares dos Santos (born 17 January 1991), known as Soares or Tiquinho, is a Brazilian professional footballer who plays as a forward for Botafogo.

Having started his career in the lower leagues of his homeland, he moved to Portugal aged 23. He played 155 Primeira Liga games for Nacional, Vitória de Guimarães and Porto, scoring 64 goals and winning two league titles with the last of those clubs. After winning the Super League Greece with Olympiacos in 2022, he moved to Botafogo in Série A.

Club career

Brazil
Born in Sousa, Paraíba, but raised in Natal, Rio Grande do Norte, Soares started his career with Palmeiras FC das Rocas. After impressing with the side he moved to América Futebol Clube (RN) in 2009, initially assigned to the youth setup.

Soares made his professional debut for the latter club on 14 August 2010, coming on as a substitute in a 2–1 Série B home loss against Vila Nova Futebol Clube. He only appeared in one further match in the championship, before being released on 3 September of that year.

Soares subsequently represented Botafogo Futebol Clube (PB), Sousa Esporte Clube, Centro Sportivo Paraibano, Cerâmica Atlético Clube, Treze Futebol Clube, Veranópolis Esporte Clube Recreativo e Cultural, Esporte Clube Pelotas and Lucena Sport Clube.

Nacional
On 27 January 2015, Soares moved abroad for the first time in his career after signing with Primeira Liga side C.D. Nacional, still owned by CSP. He made his debut for the club on 21 February, replacing Lucas João in a 3–1 away loss against S.C. Braga.

Soares scored his first goal abroad on 20 April 2015, equalising the 1–1 Madeira derby at C.S. Marítimo. The following 20 March, he scored a brace in a 3–2 home win over Vitória de Guimarães.

Vitória Guimarães
On 25 May 2016, Soares signed for Vitória de Guimarães. He made his debut for his new team on 14 August, starting in a 1–0 home loss to Braga, and scored his first goal 12 days later in a 5–3 win against F.C. Paços de Ferreira also at the Estádio D. Afonso Henriques, through a penalty.

On 4 November 2016, Soares scored a double in a 2–1 home defeat of former club Nacional. He finished his spell in Minho with 22 official appearances and nine goals.

Porto
On 23 January 2017, Soares signed a four-and-a-half-year contract with FC Porto, with a €40 million clause. His first match took place on 4 February, when he started and netted twice in a 2–1 home victory over Sporting CP.

Soares made his UEFA Champions League debut on 22 February 2017, starting in a 2–0 home loss to Juventus F.C. in the round of 16. In his first full season, he scored eight goals from 24 games to help the club to win the national championship after a five-year wait. 

Soares was not initially included in the 2018–19 Champions League squad by manager Sérgio Conceição, due to injury. On 18 January 2019, he put three past G.D. Chaves in a 4–1 away victory, his tally of 15 over the campaign eventually being the best for Porto and fourth-best in the league. On 25 May he opened the scoring in the final of the Taça de Portugal and also converted his team's first shot in the penalty shootout after the 2–2 draw, but Sporting were victorious; he dedicated his goal to goalkeeper Iker Casillas, who had suffered a heart attack weeks earlier.

On 27 February 2020, Soares was sent off for the first time in his career as the side lost 3–1 at home to Bayer 04 Leverkusen (5–2 aggregate) in the last 32 of the UEFA Europa League, for elbowing Jonathan Tah in the face.

Tianjin TEDA
Soares moved to the Chinese Super League in September 2020, agreeing to a three-year and three-month deal at Tianjin TEDA FC. The transfer fee was estimated at around €10 million, as was his total salary.

Olympiacos
On 31 May 2021, Soares joined Olympiacos F.C. of the Super League Greece on a three-year contract. On 22 September, he scored twice in a 4–1 home win against Apollon Smyrnis FC. On 22 December, he repeated the feat in the 2–0 defeat of Levadiakos F.C. in the round of 16 of the Greek Football Cup, following assists from Mathieu Valbuena.

Botafogo
Soares returned to Brazil in August 2022 after seven years, with the 31-year-old signing for Botafogo de Futebol e Regatas. He made his Campeonato Brasileiro Série A debut at the age of 31 on 4 September, starting in a 3–1 win at Fortaleza Esporte Clube; thirteen days later he scored his first goal to conclude a 2–0 win over Coritiba Foot Ball Club at the Estádio Olímpico Nilton Santos. He finished the season with six goals from 14 games, the Gloriosos second top scorer with one behind Erison despite his late arrival.

Career statistics

Honours
Botafogo-PB
Copa Paraíba: 2010

CSP
Copa Paraíba: 2012

Lucena
Campeonato Paraibano Second Division: 2014

Porto
Primeira Liga: 2017–18, 2019–20
Taça de Portugal: 2019–20
Supertaça Cândido de Oliveira: 2018

Olympiacos
Super League Greece: 2021–22

References

External links

1991 births
Living people
Sportspeople from Paraíba
Sportspeople from Rio Grande do Norte
Brazilian footballers
Association football forwards
Campeonato Brasileiro Série A players
Campeonato Brasileiro Série B players
Campeonato Brasileiro Série C players
Campeonato Brasileiro Série D players
América Futebol Clube (RN) players
Botafogo Futebol Clube (PB) players
Centro Sportivo Paraibano players
Cerâmica Atlético Clube players
Treze Futebol Clube players
Veranópolis Esporte Clube Recreativo e Cultural players
Esporte Clube Pelotas players
Botafogo de Futebol e Regatas players
Primeira Liga players
C.D. Nacional players
Vitória S.C. players
FC Porto players
Chinese Super League players
Tianjin Jinmen Tiger F.C. players
Super League Greece players
Olympiacos F.C. players
Brazilian expatriate footballers
Expatriate footballers in Portugal
Expatriate footballers in China
Expatriate footballers in Greece
Brazilian expatriate sportspeople in Portugal
Brazilian expatriate sportspeople in China
Brazilian expatriate sportspeople in Greece